Historic or notable lime kilns include.

Australia

Lime Kiln Remains, Ipswich
Pipers Creek Lime Kilns
Raffan's Mill and Brick Bottle Kilns
There were a number of lime kilns at Wool Bay, South Australia.  One kiln remains and was listed along with the jetty under the name of Wool Bay Lime Kiln & Jetty on the South Australian Heritage Register on 28 November 1985.

There also are or were lime kilns at:
Adelaide Brighton Cement
Anna Creek Station
Blayney, New South Wales
Bower, South Australia
Claremont, Ipswich
Coopers Creek, Victoria
Galong, New South Wales
Kingston and Arthur's Vale Historic Area
Langshaw Marble Lime Works
Marmor, Queensland
New Farm, Queensland
North Coogee
Platina railway station
Point Nepean
Portland Cement Works Precinct
Portland, New South Wales
Quarry Amphitheatre
Quartz Roasting Pits Complex
South Fremantle, Western Australia
Walkerville, Victoria
Waurn Ponds, Victoria

United Kingdom

Annery kiln, Monkleigh, England
Limekilns at Kiln Park, Pembrokeshire, Penally, Wales
Cocking Lime Works, West Sussex, England
Grove Lime Kiln, Isle of Portland, England
Minera Limeworks, Wrexham, Wales
Solva limekilns, Pembrokeshire, Wales

There are or were lime kilns at many other places in the United Kingdom.

United States

See also
 Lime Kiln (disambiguation)
:Category:Lime kilns in Canada
:Category:Lime kilns in France
:Category:Lime kilns in Germany
:Category:Lime kilns in Hong Kong
:Category:Lime kilns in Hungary
:Category:Lime kilns in Ireland
:Category:Lime kilns in Italy
:Category:Lime kilns in Latvia
:Category:Lime kilns in Portugal
:Category:Lime kilns in Slovenia
:Category:Lime kilns in South Africa
:Category:Lime kilns in Sweden

References

lime kilns